Irish Republican Movement is a dissident republican vigilante group founded in April 2018. They formed as a splinter group of Óglaigh na hÉireann, after they went on ceasefire in 2018.

See also 
 Republican movement (Ireland)

References

2018 establishments in Ireland
Dissident Irish republican campaign
Irish republican militant groups
Organizations established in 2018
Paramilitary organisations based in Northern Ireland
Paramilitary punishment attacks in Northern Ireland